USCM may refer to:

 United States Conference of Mayors
 Magnitogorsk International Airport
 United States Colonial Marines, a fictional military unit in the film Aliens